The Clover Fork is a  tributary of the Cumberland River, draining a section of the Appalachian Mountains in Harlan County, southeast Kentucky in the United States. The river's confluence with the Martin's Fork at Harlan marks the official beginning of the Cumberland River.

The Clover Fork formerly flowed through Harlan and joined Martin's Fork on the west side of town. Due to recurring flood damage, a project of the U.S. Army Corps of Engineers diverted the river through four approximately  tunnels to bypass the city to the north. The diversion project was completed in 1989.

See also
List of rivers of Kentucky

References

Rivers of Kentucky
Rivers of Harlan County, Kentucky
Tributaries of the Cumberland River